Joseph Reade may refer to:

 Joseph Reade (politician) (1694–1771), American vestryman and politician
 Joseph Bancroft Reade (1801–1870), English clergyman and early photographer

See also
Joseph Read (disambiguation)